Mattia Corradi (born 12 January 1990) is an Italian professional footballer who plays for  club Pro Sesto.

Career

Monza
Born in Melzo, Lombardy, Corradi started his career at Lombard club Monza. He played twice for the first team in 2007–08 Serie C1. Corradi also played game 1, 3 & 4 in Serie C Cup.

AlbinoLeffe
On 8 August 2008 Corradi was signed by another Lombard team AlbinoLeffe for €250,000 in co-ownership deal in 4-year contract. He spent a season in Primavera reserve team. The reserve team was eliminated by Lazio in the round of 16 of the playoffs. Corradi was signed by the Serie B club outright in June 2009, for €20,000.

On 5 August 2009 Corradi was signed by Mezzocorona in temporary deal. He remained in Lega Pro 2nd Division (ex- Serie C2) in 2010–11 season, for Pro Vercelli. He was sent off in the round 31 and suspended 5 games (later reduced to 4). Pro Vercelli promoted to L.P. Prime Div. (ex- Serie C1) in August 2011 to fill the vacancies. Pro Vercelli also received €16,500 from AlbinoLeffe as premio valorizzazione.

Corradi made 4 appearances for AlbinoLeffe in 2011–12 Serie B. He wore no.17 shirt for the first team during that season. He also signed a new 3-year contract circa 2011. At the end of season the club relegated. Corradi followed the team to play in the third division from 2012 to 2015.

Serie C
On 25 July 2015 Corradi was signed by Cuneo.

On 4 January 2021, he joined Modena.

On 3 July 2021, he moved to Feralpisalò.

On 5 August 2022, Corradi signed with Pro Sesto.

References

External links
 AIC profile (data by football.it) 

1990 births
Living people
People from Melzo
Italian footballers
Association football midfielders
Serie B players
Serie C players
A.C. Monza players
U.C. AlbinoLeffe players
A.C. Mezzocorona players
F.C. Pro Vercelli 1892 players
A.C. Cuneo 1905 players
S.S. Arezzo players
Piacenza Calcio 1919 players
Modena F.C. players
FeralpiSalò players
S.S.D. Pro Sesto players
Footballers from Lombardy
Sportspeople from the Metropolitan City of Milan